G107 may refer to:
 China National Highway 107
 WGSM (aka G107), a Classic Hits radio station serving the Westmoreland County area